Barbara Jean Harwerth (born March 6, 1941) is a former volleyball player. Born in La Crosse, Wisconsin, she played for the United States national team at the 1964 Summer Olympics.

References

1941 births
Living people
Sportspeople from La Crosse, Wisconsin
Olympic volleyball players of the United States
Volleyball players at the 1964 Summer Olympics
American women's volleyball players
21st-century American women